Australian Aboriginal Pidgin English is any of a number of English contact pidgins spoken or once spoken in Australia:

 Port Jackson Pidgin English (New South Wales)
 Queensland Kanaka English
 South Australian Pidgin English